Voice print may refer to:

 VoicePrint, a Canadian audio-only TV network
 Spectrogram, an image representing the sounds in a voice
 Voice print, a verification method of speaker recognition
 Voiceprint Records, an English record label